Pertyia sericea is a species of beetle in the family Cerambycidae, the only species in the genus Pertyia.

References

Acanthocinini